The House at 1 Woodcrest Drive in Wakefield, Massachusetts is a well-preserved late 18th-century Federal-style house.  Built c. 1789, the -story timber-frame house has a typical five-bay front facade with center entry, and two interior chimneys.  The doorway is framed by a surround with -length sidelight windows and flanking pilasters, topped by a modest entablature.  It has two bake ovens, and its interior walls were originally insulated with corn cobs.

The house was listed on the National Register of Historic Places in 1989.

See also
National Register of Historic Places listings in Wakefield, Massachusetts
National Register of Historic Places listings in Middlesex County, Massachusetts

References

Houses on the National Register of Historic Places in Wakefield, Massachusetts
Federal architecture in Massachusetts
Houses completed in 1789
Houses in Wakefield, Massachusetts
1789 establishments in Massachusetts